Amos Walker is a fictional character in a series of books by sometime western author Loren D. Estleman. He is a private detective who lives on the Detroit-Hamtramck border and works in Detroit, Michigan.

As a Vietnam vet who boxed in college and served as a military policeman, he is sharp and streetwise. But, like all good "eyes", he has an irreverent side. Amos was fired from the Detroit Police while still in Academy for punching someone out in the shower. In Motor City Blue, set around 1980, Amos is in his thirties and the character has aged in later novels. Amos is a traditionalist. As one reviewer noted:

Bibliography
Motor City Blue
Angel Eyes
The Midnight Man
The Glass Highway
Sugartown
Every Brilliant Eye
Lady Yesterday
Down River
Silent Thunder
Sweet Women Lie (1990)
Never Street
The Witchfinder
The Hours of the Virgin
A Smile on the Face of the Tiger
Sinister Heights
Poison Blonde
Retro (2004)
Nicotine Kiss (2006)
American Detective (2007)
Left-handed Dollar (2010)
Amos Walker: The Complete Story Collection (2010; short stories)
Infernal Angels (2011)
Burning Midnight (2012)
Don't Look for Me (2014)
You Know Who Killed Me (2014)
The Sundown Speech (2015)
The Lioness Is the Hunter (2017)
Black and White Ball (2018)
When Old Midnight Comes Along (2019)
Monkey in the Middle (2022)
City Walls (2023)

References

Fictional private investigators
Fictional characters from Detroit
Detroit Police Department officers
Fictional portrayals of the Detroit Police Department